Carl Esmond (born Karl Simon; June 14, 1902– December 4, 2004) was an Austrian-born American film and stage actor, born in Vienna, Austria-Hungary. Although his age was given as 33 in the passenger list when he arrived in the USA in January 1938, in his naturalization petition his birth year is stated as 1902. His stage names were Willy Eichberger and Charles Esmond and finally Carl Esmond. He trained at Vienna's State Academy of Dramatic Arts, and made his film debut in the operetta The Emperor's Waltz (1933). He was active in the Viennese genre of shallow romantic comedies so popular in the Austria of the interwar period.

Esmond fled Germany following the Nazi takeover, first to the UK and finally in January 1938 to the USA. Esmond continued to appear on stage as well as in British and American films. He appeared in over 50 films and numerous television programs.

Death 
Esmond died in Brentwood, Los Angeles in 2004 at the age of 102.

Filmography

 The Emperor's Waltz (1933) as Viktor Eggersdorf
 Liebelei (1933) as Oberleutnant Theo Kaiser
 Little Girl, Great Fortune  (1933) as Georg Hellwig
 Inge and the Millions (1933) as Walter Brink
 Blossom Time (1934) as Count Rudi von Hohenberg
 Evensong (1934) as Archduke Theodore
 Love Conquers All (1934) as Willy Schneider
 Invitation to the Waltz (1935) as Carl
 Blood Brothers (1935) as Mirko
 Die Pompadour (1935) as François Boucher
 The Postman from Longjumeau (1936) as Chapelou
 The Empress's Favourite (1936) as Fähnrich Alexander Tomsky 
 Fräulein Veronika (1936) as Paul Schmidt
  (1936) as Fred
 Court Theatre (1936) as Josef Rainer
 Romance (1936) as Graf Eduard Romanel
 The Dawn Patrol (1938) as Hauptmann Von Mueller
 Thunder Afloat (1939) as U-boat Captain
 Little Men (1940) as Professor Bhaer
 Sergeant York (1941) as German Major
 Sundown (1941) as Jan Kuypens
 Pacific Rendezvous (1942) as Andre Leemuth
 Panama Hattie (1942) as Lucas Kefler (uncredited)
 The Navy Comes Through (1942) as Richerd Kroner
 Seven Sweethearts (1942) as Carl Randall
 Margin for Error (1943) as Baron Max von Alvenstor
 First Comes Courage (1943) as Maj. Paul Dichter
 Address Unknown (1944) as Baron von Freische
 The Story of Dr. Wassell (1944) as Lt. Dirk van Daal
 Resisting Enemy Interrogation (1944) as Major von Behn (uncredited)
 The Master Race (1944) as Dr. Andrei Krystoff
 Ministry of Fear (1944) as Willi Hilfe
 Experiment Perilous (1944) as Maitland
 Without Love (1945) as Paul Carrell
 Her Highness and the Bellboy (1945) as Baron Zoltan Faludi
 This Love of Ours (1945) as Uncle Bob
 The Catman of Paris (1946) as Charles Regnier
 Lover Come Back (1946) as Paul Millard
 Smash-Up, the Story of a Woman (1947) as Dr. Lorenz
 Slave Girl (1947) as El Hamid
 Walk a Crooked Mile (1948) as Dr. Ritter von Stolb
 The Desert Hawk (1950) as Kibar
 Mystery Submarine (1950) as Lt. Heldman
 Racket Squad (1951)
 Stars Over Hollywood (1951)
 The World in His Arms (1952) as Prince Semyon
 Gruen Guild Playhouse (1952) as Baron de Sarnac, Chief of Police
 Biff Baker, U.S.A. (1952) as Major Morovik
 Schlitz Playhouse of Stars (1952) as Count Borselli
 Ford Theatre (1953) as Maurice de Szekely
 Love's Awakening (1953) as Michael Rainer
 Regina Amstetten (1954) as Prof. Werner Grüter
 Lola Montès (1955) as Doctor
 Crossroads (1956, TV Series) as Major Zuntz
 Lux Video Theatre (1955–1956, TV Series) as Pierre / Victor Laszlo
 Jane Wyman Presents: The Fireside Theatre (1956)
 Cheyenne (1956) as Col. Picard
 Passport to Danger (1955–1956, TV Series) as Fabian
 The Joseph Cotten Show (1955–1956, TV Series) as Vail
 Soldiers of Fortune (1955–1956, TV Series) as Nicholas Van Loon / Helmut Van Dorn
 Climax! (1957) as Paul Ehrenhardt
 Meet McGraw (1957) as Baron Von Schekt
 From the Earth to the Moon (1958) as Jules Verne
 Behind Closed Doors (1959) as Dr. Haas
 General Electric Theater (1959) as Nikolas Bethlan
 Thunder in the Sun (1959) as Andre Dauphin
 77 Sunset Strip (1959) as Kurt von Paulus
 Five Fingers (1959, TV Series) as Marcuse
 Behind Closed Doors (1959, TV Series) as Dr. Haas
 Alcoa Presents: One Step Beyond (1960) as Emile
 The Deputy (1960) as Duke Dmitri
 Maverick (1961) as Comte deLisle
 Hawaiian Eye (1961) as Von Steuben
 Brushfire (1962) as Martin
 Hitler (1962) as Field Marshal Wilhelm Keitel
 Kiss of Evil (1963) as Anton (US TV version)
 The Travels of Jaimie McPheeters (1964) as Baron Pyrrhos
 Morituri (1965) as Busch
 Run for Your Life (1965) as Otto Hiltz
 Convoy (1965) as Field Marshal Von Spear
 Agent for H.A.R.M. (1966) as Professor Jan Stefánik
 The Man from U.N.C.L.E. (1966, TV Series) as Baron Freddy de Chasseur
 Garrison's Gorillas (1967, TV Series) as German General
 Insight (1967, TV Series)
 The Big Valley (1967, TV Series) as Marquis de Laccaise
 To Rome With Love (1970, TV Series) as Kurt
 O'Hara, U.S. Treasury (1972, TV Series) as August Werner
 McMillan & Wife (1972, TV Series) as Zeiss
 The Hardy Boys/Nancy Drew Mysteries (1977, TV Series) as Kolbe
 My Wicked, Wicked Ways: The Legend of Errol Flynn (1985, TV Movie) as General Von Helmuth (final film role)

Notes

References

External links

 
 Photographs of Carl Esmond
 Carl Esmond Obituary in The Independent

1902 births
2004 deaths
20th-century Austrian male actors
Austrian centenarians
Austrian expatriate male actors in the United States
Austrian male film actors
Austrian male silent film actors
Austrian male television actors
Male actors from Vienna
Men centenarians